Yogesh is an Indian masculine given name.

Notable people 
 Yogesh (actor) (born 1990), Indian actor
 Yogesh (lyricist) (born 1943), Indian writer and lyricist
 Yogesh Atal (1937–2018), Indian sociologist
 Yogesh Chander Deveshwar (born 1947), Indian businessman
 Yogesh Gholap, Indian politician of Maharashtra
 Yogesh Golwalkar (born 1980), Indian cricket player
 Yogesh Jaluria, scientist
 Yogesh Joshi, several people
 Yogesh Kumar Joshi (born 1962), Indian soldier
 Yogesh Kumar Sabharwal (1942–2015), Indian judge
 Yogesh Kumar Sanan (born 1964), Indian bodybuilder
 Yogesh Mahansaria, Indian entrepreneur
 Yogesh Mittal (born 1976), Indian film director
 Yogesh Nagar (born 1990), Indian cricket player
 Yogesh Patil (born 1972), Indian politician from Maharashtra
 Yogesh Pratap Singh (born 1959), Indian lawyer and activist
 Yogesh Praveen (1938–2021), Indian author
 Yogesh Rawat (born 1992), Indian cricket player
 Yogesh Sagar, Indian politician of Maharashtra
 Yogesh Samsi (born 1968), Indian tabla player
 Yogesh Takawale (born 1984), Indian cricket player
 Yogesh Tilekar, Indian politician

See also 
 Yogeshwar, a related name

References 

Indian masculine given names